Anja Milenkovič (born 23 June 1982) is a Slovenian footballer who plays for LUV Graz of the Austrian ÖFB-Frauenliga and the Slovenia national team. She has previously played in the Italian Serie A, for UPC Tavagnacco and Chiasiellis.

Career
Milenkovič started her career in 2001 playing for Tiskarna Novo Mesto. Three years later she signed for national powerhouse Krka Novo Mesto. There she won three Slovenian championships and two Slovenian cups and played in the UEFA Women's Cup.

After four seasons with Krka, in 2008 she started her career abroad signing for UPC Tavagnacco in Italy's Serie A. One year later she moved to Austria to play for SK Kelag Kärnten of the Frauenliga, where she spent two seasons before returning to Serie A in 2011, with Calcio Chiasiellis.

International career
She is also member of the Slovenia women's national football team.

References

External links 

 Profile at LUV Graz 

1982 births
Living people
Slovenian women's footballers
Footballers from Ljubljana
Slovenia women's international footballers
Serie A (women's football) players
Expatriate women's footballers in Austria
Expatriate women's footballers in Italy
Slovenian expatriate footballers
Slovenian expatriate sportspeople in Austria
Slovenian expatriate sportspeople in Italy
Women's association football midfielders
U.P.C. Tavagnacco players
A.S.D. Calcio Chiasiellis players
ÖFB-Frauenliga players
SK Sturm Graz (women) players
ŽNK Olimpija Ljubljana players
ŽNK Krka players
DFC LUV Graz players